The following is an incomplete list of cliffs of the world.

Asia

Above sea
 Tōjinbō, Sakai, Fukui prefecture, Japan 25 m above Sea of Japan
 Qingshui Cliff, Xiulin Township, Hualien County, Taiwan averaging 800 m above Pacific Ocean. The tallest peak, Qingshui Mountain, rises 2,408 m directly from the Pacific Ocean.
 Theoprosopon, between Chekka and Selaata in north Lebanon jutting into the Mediterranean.

Above land
 Nanga Parbat, Rupal Face, Azad Kashmir, Pakistan, 4,600 m
 Gyala Peri, southeast face, Mêdog County, Tibet, China, 4,600 m
 Ultar Sar southwest face, Karakoram, Gilgit–Baltistan, Pakistan, 3,000 m
 Qingshui Cliff, Xiulin Township, Hualien County, Taiwan averaging 800 m above Pacific Ocean. The tallest peak, Qingshui Mountain, rises 2,408 m directly from the Pacific Ocean.
 Trango Towers: East Face Great Trango Tower, Baltoro Muztagh, Gilgit–Baltistan, Pakistan, 1,340 m (near vertical headwall), 2,100 m (very steep overall drop from East Summit to Dunge Glacier). Northwest Face drops approximately 2,200 m to the Trango Glacier below, but with a taller slab topped out with a shorter overhanging headwall of approximately 1,000 m. The Southwest "Azeem" Ridge forms the group's tallest steep rise of roughly 2,286 m from the Trango Glacier to the Southwest summit.
 Uli Biaho Towers, Baltoro Glacier, Gilgit–Baltistan, Pakistan
 Baintha Brakk (The Ogre), Panmah Muztagh, Gilgit–Baltistan, Pakistan, 2,000 m
 The Latok Group, Panmah Muztagh, Gilgit–Baltistan, Pakistan, 1,800 m
 Spantik northwest face, Karakoram, Gilgit–Baltistan, Pakistan, 2,000 m
 Shispare Sar southwest face, Karakoram, Gilgit–Baltistan, Pakistan, 3,200 m
 Hunza Peak south face, Karakoram, Gilgit–Baltistan, Pakistan, 1,700 m
 Lhotse south face, Mahalangur Himal, Nepal, 3,200 m
 Lhotse northeast face, Mahalangur Himal, Nepal, 2,900 m
 K2 west face, Karakoram, Gilgit–Baltistan, Pakistan, 2,900 m
 Meru Peak, Uttarakhand, India, 1,200 m.
 Ramon Crater, Israel, 400 m
 Various cliffs in the Ak-Su Valley of Kyrgyzstan are high and steep.
 World's End, Horton Plains, Nuwara Eliya, Sri Lanka. It has a sheer drop of about 1,200 m.
 Various cliffs in Zhangjiajie National Forest Park, Hunan Province, China. The cliffs can get to around 300 m.

Europe

Above sea
 Hornelen, Norway,  860 m above Skatestraumen
 Los Gigantos, Tenerife, 800m above Atlantic Ocean https://en.m.wikipedia.org/wiki/Los_Gigantes
 Cape Enniberg, Faroe Islands, 750 m above North Atlantic
 Croaghaun, Achill Island, Ireland, 688 m above Atlantic Ocean
 Hvanndalabjarg, Ólafsfjörður, Iceland, 630 m above Atlantic Ocean
 Vixía Herbeira, Northern Galicia, Spain, 621 m above Atlantic Ocean
 Preikestolen, Norway, 604 m above Lysefjorden
 Slieve League, Ireland, 601 m above Atlantic Ocean

 Monte Solaro, Capri, Italy, 589 m above the Mediterranean Sea
 Jaizkibel, Spain, 547 m above the Bay of Biscay
 Beinisvørð, Faroe Islands, 470 m above North Atlantic
 Conachair, St Kilda, Scotland 427 m above Atlantic Ocean, highest sea cliff in the UK
 Cap Canaille, France, 394 m above Mediterranean sea is the highest sea cliff in France
 The Kame, Foula, Shetland, 376 m above the North Atlantic, second highest sea cliff in the UK
 Hangman cliffs, Devon 318 m above Bristol Channel is the highest sea cliff in England
 Benwee Head Cliffs, Erris, Co. Mayo, Ireland, 304 m above Atlantic Ocean
 Dingli Cliffs, Malta, 250 m above Mediterranean sea
 High Cliff, between Boscastle and St Gennys, 223 m above Celtic Sea
 Cliffs of Moher, Ireland, 217 m above Atlantic Ocean
 Beachy Head, England, 162 m above the English Channel
 Møns Klint, Denmark, 143 m above Baltic Sea
 Le Tréport, France, 110 m above the English Channel
 White cliffs of Dover, England, 100 m above the Strait of Dover
 Étretat, France, 84 m above the English Channel
 Kaliakra cliffs, Bulgaria, more than 70 m above the Black Sea
 Ontika Limestone cliff, Estonia, 55 m above Baltic Sea.
 Snake Island, Ukraine, 41 m above the Black Sea

Above land
 The six great north faces of the Alps (Eiger 1,500 m, Matterhorn 1,350 m, Grandes Jorasses 1,100 m, Petit Dru 1,000 m, and Piz Badile 850 m, Cima Grande di Lavaredo 450 m)
 Troll Wall, Norway 1,100 m above base
 Mięguszowiecki Szczyt north face rises to 1,043 m above Morskie Oko lake level, High Tatras, Poland
 Kjerag, Norway 984 m.
 Giewont (north face), Tatra Mountains, Poland, 852 m above Polana Strążyska glade
 Mont Granier, in the French Chartreuse Mountains, 700 m
 Vihren peak north face, Pirin Mountain, Bulgaria 460 m to the (Golemiya Kazan)
 Dvuglav, Rila Mountain, Bulgaria 460 m (south face)
 Vratsata, Vrachanski Balkan Nature Park, Bulgaria 400 m
 Belogradchik Rocks, Bulgaria - up to 200 m high sandstone towers

North America 

Several big granite faces in the Arctic region vie for the title of 'highest vertical drop on Earth', but reliable measurements are not always available. The possible contenders include (measurements are approximate):

 Mount Thor, Baffin Island, Canada;  total; the top  are overhanging.
 The sheer north face of Polar Sun Spire, Baffin Island, rises 4,300 ft above the flat frozen fjord, although the lower portion of the face breaks from the vertical wall with a series of ledges and buttresses.
 Ketil's and its neighbor Ulamertorsuaq's west faces in Tasermiut, Greenland have been reported as over 1,000 m high. Another relevant cliff in Greenland is Agdlerussakasit's Thumbnail.

Other notable cliffs include:

 Mount Asgard, Baffin Island, Canada; vertical drop of about 1,200 m (4,000 ft).
 El Capitan, Yosemite Valley, California, United States; 900 m (3,000 ft)
 Toroweap (a.k.a. Tuweep), Grand Canyon, Arizona, United States; 900 m (3,000 ft)
 Painted Wall in Black Canyon of the Gunnison National Park, Colorado, United States; 685 m (2,250 ft)
 Northwest Face of Half Dome, near El Capitan, California, United States; 1,444 m (4,737 ft) total, vertical portion about 610 m (2,000 ft)
 East face of the West Temple in Zion National Park, Utah, United States believed to be the tallest sandstone cliff in the world, 670 m
 All faces of Devils Tower, Wyoming, United States, 195 m
 Faces of Shiprock, New Mexico, United States, 400 m
 Cap Éternité of Saguenay River, Quebec, Canada, 347 m
 The North Face of North Twin Peak, Rocky Mountains, Alberta, Canada, 1,200 m
 Raftsmen's Acropolis, a rock face of the Montagne des Érables, Quebec, Canada, 800 m
 Rockwall, Kootenay National Park, British Columbia, Canada, 30 km of mostly unbroken cliffs up to 900 m
 All walls of the Stawamus Chief, Squamish, British Columbia, Canada, up to 500 m
 Calvert Cliffs along the Chesapeake Bay in Maryland, U.S. 25 m
 Mount Siyeh, Glacier National Park (U.S.) north face, 
 Longs Peak Diamond, Rocky Mountain National Park, Colorado, United States, 400 m
 Royal Gorge cliffs, Colorado, United States, 350 m
 Doublet Peak, southwest face, Wind River Range, Wyoming, United States, 370 m
 Big Sandy Mountain, east face buttress, Wind River Range, Wyoming, US, 550 m
 Temple Peak, east face, Wind River Range, Wyoming, US,400 m
 East Temple Peak, north face, Wind River Range, Wyoming, US, 450 m
 Uncompahgre Peak, northeast face, San Juan Range, Colorado, US, 275 m (550 m rise above surrounding plateau)
 Grand Teton, north face Teton Range, Wyoming, US 
 Ättestupan Cliff, northern side of Kaiser Franz Joseph Fjord, Greenland

South America 

 Pared Sur Cerro Aconcagua. Las Heras, Mendoza, Argentina, 2,700 m
 Scratched Stone (Pedra Riscada), São José do Divino/MG, Minas Gerais, Brazil, 1,480 m
 All faces of Auyan Tepui, along with all other Tepuis, Venezuela, Brazil, and Guyana, Auyan Tepui is about 1,000 m (location of Angel Falls) (the falls are 979 m, the highest in the world)
 Pared de Gocta, Peru, 771 m
 Pedra Azul, Pedra Azul State Park, Espirito Santo, Brazil, 540 m
 Pão de Açúcar/Sugar Loaf, Rio de Janeiro, Brazil, 395 m
 All faces of Cerro Torre, Patagonia, Chile-Argentina
 All faces of Cerro Chalten (Fitz Roy), Patagonia, Argentina-Chile, 1200 m
 Faces of the Torres del Paine group, Patagonia, Chile, up to 900 m

Africa

Above sea
 Faneque, Gran Canaria, Spain,  1,027 m above Atlantic Ocean
 Cabo Girão, Madeira, Portugal, 589 m above Atlantic Ocean

Above land
The Tugela Falls, the world's second tallest waterfall, falls  over the edge of the cliff face.
 Mount Meru, Tanzania Caldera Cliffs, 
 Innumerable peaks in the Drakensberg mountains of South Africa are considered cliff formations. The Drakensberg Range is regarded, together with Ethiopia's Simien Mountains, as one of the two finest erosional mountain ranges on Earth. Because of their near-unique geological formation, the range has an extraordinarily high percentage of cliff faces making up its length, particularly along the highest portion of the range. Of all, the "Drakensberg Amphitheatre" (mentioned above) is most well known. Other notable cliffs include the Trojan Wall, Cleft Peak, Injisuthi Triplets, Cathedral Peak, Monk's Cowl, Mnweni Buttress, etc.

Oceania

Above sea
 Mitre Peak, New Zealand, 1,683 m above Milford Sound 

 The Lion, New Zealand, 1,302 m above Milford Sound (drops from approx 1,280 m to sea level in a very short distance)
 The Elephant, New Zealand, has cliffs falling approx 1,180m into Milford Sound, and a 900 m drop in less than 300 m horizontally
 Kalaupapa, Hawaii, 1,010 m above Pacific Ocean
 Great Australian Bight
 Zuytdorp Cliffs in Western Australia
 Ball's Pyramid, a sea stack 562 m high and only 200 m across at its base
 The Twelve Apostles (Victoria). A series of sea stacks in Australia, ranging from approximately 50 to 70 m above the Bass Strait
 Tasman National Park, Tasmania, has 300 m dolerite sea cliffs dropping directly to the ocean in columnar form
 Lovers Leap, Highcliff, and The Chasm, on Otago Peninsula, New Zealand, all 200 to 300 m above the Pacific Ocean

Above land
 Mount Banks in the Blue Mountains National Park, New South Wales, Australia: west of its saddle there is a 490 m fall within 100 m horizontally.

References

Geography-related lists